Scoparia trapezophora is a species of moth in the family Crambidae. It is endemic in New Zealand.

Taxonomy
This species was named by Edward Meyrick in 1884. Meyrick gave a description of the species in 1885. However the placement of this species within the genus Scoparia is in doubt. As a result, this species has also been referred to as Scoparia (s.l.) trapezophora.

Description

The wingspan is about 21 mm. The forewings are pale whitish-ochreous, with an oblong blackish spot from the base of the costa, reaching more than half across wing. There is a large sharply defined blackish blotch, extending along the costa, reaching only half across the wing. The inner margin is suffused with whitish. The second line is white and dark-margined and the terminal area is irrorated with dark fuscous, especially towards the costa. The subterminal line is cloudy whitish. The hindwings are grey-whitish. The postmedian line and hindmargin are somewhat darker. Adults have been recorded on wing in January.

References

Moths described in 1884
Moths of New Zealand
Scorparia
Endemic fauna of New Zealand
Taxa named by Edward Meyrick
Endemic moths of New Zealand